...from the "Hungry i" is the Kingston Trio's first live album, released in 1959. It was recorded in 1958 at the San Francisco club hungry i shortly after the release of their debut album The Kingston Trio.  It was awarded an RIAA gold album on October 24, 1960, and presented to the group in 1961.

History
What producer Voyle Gilmore heard when he first saw the Kingston Trio at The Purple Onion in 1958 persuaded him to sign the group to Capitol Records. ...from the "Hungry i" was released in order to expose the record buying public to what live audiences experienced at a Trio performance. This appeal was successfully conveyed with this live album, indicated by its number 2 chart position and receiving a gold album award. The Trio was a carefully rehearsed act, the jokes and introductions to songs planned, delivered and also graded by their manager Frank Werber. Gilmore recorded two nights of the group's twenty-seven-day engagement at the club.

In 1964, the hungry i would also be the location for the recording of the final album for Capitol (Back in Town) by the John Stewart  Trio.

Reception

The album was awarded an RIAA gold album on October 24, 1960.

In his Allmusic review, critic Ronnie D. Lankford Jr. notes the intensity of the trio's performances and the audience reactions. Lankford writes their first live album "captures the band live, singing vibrant versions of "Tic, Tic" and "They Call the Wind Maria." Because of the acoustic arrangements and professionalism of the band, this live performance easily matches the quality of the group's studio work."

Reissues
...from the "Hungry i" was released on CD by Capitol Records in 1992 paired with The Kingston Trio. It has since been withdrawn by Capitol.
 In 1997, all of the tracks of ...from the "Hungry i" were included in The Guard Years 10-CD box set issued by Bear Family Records.
 Collector's Choice Records reissued The Kingston Trio / ...from the "Hungry" i as a two-album CD in 2001.
Some tracks from ...from the "Hungry i" were reissued in 1961 by Capitol on Encores, a duophonic reissue of cuts from the first two albums.
The original LP was reissued as a "Capitol Monophonic Re-issue" ca. 1980 with Capitol Records catalog number M-11968. The back of the record jacket had a UPC symbol in the upper right with the code 0 7777-11968-1. The label on the record was black lettering on dark blue with a large classic Capitol logo at the top.

Track listing
The original LP release had eleven songs.

Personnel
Dave Guard – vocals, banjo, guitar
Bob Shane – vocals, guitar
Nick Reynolds – vocals, tenor guitar, bongos, conga
David "Buck" Wheat – bass

Chart positions

See also
1959 in music

References

External links
 The Kingston Trio Liner Notes album entry. 
 The Kingston Trio Timeline.

The Kingston Trio live albums
Albums produced by Voyle Gilmore
1959 live albums
Capitol Records live albums